The 2002 Milan–San Remo was the 93rd edition of the monument classic Milan–San Remo and was won by Italian Mario Cipollini of Acqua & Sapone-.

Results

External links
Results from MilanSanRemo.co.uk

2002
March 2002 sports events in Europe
2002 in road cycling
2002 in Italian sport
Milan-San Remo